The grey-headed oliveback (Delacourella capistrata), also known as the white-cheeked oliveback, is a common species of estrildid finch found in Africa. It has an estimated global extent of occurrence of 800,000 km2.

It is found in Benin, Burkina Faso, Cameroon, Central African Republic, Chad, The Democratic Republic of the Congo, Côte d'Ivoire, Gambia, Ghana, Guinea, Guinea-Bissau, Mali, Nigeria, Sierra Leone, South Sudan, Togo & Uganda. The status of the species is evaluated as Least Concern.

Origin
Origin and phylogeny has been obtained by Antonio Arnaiz-Villena et al. Estrildinae may have originated in India and dispersed thereafter (towards Africa and Pacific Ocean habitats).

References

BirdLife Species Factsheet

grey-headed oliveback
Birds of Sub-Saharan Africa
grey-headed oliveback
Taxobox binomials not recognized by IUCN